The Poland national under-20 football team represents Poland in association football at an under-20 age level and is controlled by Polish Football Association, the governing body for football in Poland.

Competitive record
*Denotes draws include knockout matches decided on penalty kicks.
Gold background colour indicates that the tournament was won.
Silver background colour indicates second-place finish.
Bronze background colour indicates third-place finish.
Red border color indicates tournament was held on home soil.

FIFA U-20 World Cup

Road to FIFA U-20 World Cup 2007

Team overview
Poland enjoyed a highly successful UEFA U-19 European Championship. The Central Europeans excelled in their role as tournament hosts, and the Polish U-19s also sealed a much sought-after berth at the FIFA U-20 World Cup Canada 2007, where the team coached by Michal Globisz could easily prove one of the surprise packages.

Qualifying
The U-19-European Championships on home soil started badly for the home team with a demoralizing 1-0 Group A reverse against Austria. However, the players roused themselves for their crucial second fixture and registered a convincing 4-1 victory over Belgium. A semi-final berth was at stake in the final group fixture against the Czech Republic, but although home dreams of a place in the last four evaporated in a 2-0 defeat to the Czechs, the Poles had done enough to secure a third-place finish in the Group and with it a ticket to the FIFA U-20 World Cup Canada 2007.

Road to FIFA U-20 World Cup 2019
Being the host of the tournament, Poland automatically qualified. With an inexperienced youth squad, having previously unable to qualify for any major U-19 European Championship and only competed in much smaller Under 20 Elite League, Poland put the tournament with pressure. They were grouped with Colombia, Senegal and Tahiti.

Poland managed to finish third in their group, after managing a lone 5–0 win over Tahiti and holding Senegal goalless draw, previously lost 0–2 to Colombia. This helped Poland to qualify to the round of sixteen, where they were unfortunate to face juggernaut Italy. Despite its resistance, Poland still lost by a penalty, thus for the second time Poland was eliminated from the round of sixteen.

Results and fixtures

Players

Current squad
The following players were selected for an Elite League match against Czech Republic on 24 March 2023.
Caps and goals updated as of 21 November 2022 after the match against .

Recent call-ups
The following players (born in 2002 or later) have previously been called up to the Poland under-20 squad in the last 12 months and are still eligible to represent:

INJ Withdrew from the squad due to an injury.

U21 Withdrew from the squad due to a call up to the under-21 team.

See also
 Poland national football team
 Poland Olympic football team
 Poland national under-21 football team
 Poland national under-19 football team
 Poland national under-18 football team
 Poland national under-17 football team
 Poland national under-16 football team

References

External links
Official website
Polish Soccer
Pawel Mogielnicki's Page
Poland in World Cups

European national under-20 association football teams
U